Kakoli, also rendered as Kakuli, may refer to:
 Kakoli, Bushehr
 Kakoli, Fars
 Kakoli, North Khorasan
 Umbo Ungu dialect of Kaugel language of Papua New Guinea

See also

Karoli (name)